Livestock Exchange Building may refer to:

Kansas City Live Stock Exchange, Kansas City, Missouri
Livestock Exchange Building, part of the NRHP-listed Fort Worth Stockyards, Fort Worth, Texas
Livestock Exchange Building (St. Joseph, Missouri)
Livestock Exchange Building (Omaha, Nebraska)